Egyptian Bridge (Египетский мост) in St. Petersburg, Russia, carries Lermontovsky Avenue (Лермонтовский проспект) over the Fontanka River.

The one-span suspension bridge that it replaced was of historical interest as a monument to early 19th-century Egyptomania. It was constructed in 1825–1826 based on designs by two civil engineers, Von Traitteur and Christianowicz. Its granite abutments were topped with cast-iron sphinxes and hexagonal lanterns. An unusual feature was a pair of cast-iron gates featuring Egyptian-style columns, ornaments, and hieroglyphics, with many details of the ironwork elaborately gilded.

The original bridge, used by both pedestrians and horse-drawn transport, collapsed on 20 January 1905 when a cavalry squadron was marching across it. The present structure, incorporating sphinxes and several other details from the 19th-century bridge, was completed in 1955.

See also 
 Quay with Sphinxes

External links 

Bridges in Saint Petersburg
Suspension bridges in Russia
Bridges completed in 1826
Bridges completed in 1955
Egyptian Revival architecture
Bridge disasters in Russia
1905 disasters in Europe
1905 in the Russian Empire
1826 establishments in the Russian Empire
Cultural heritage monuments of federal significance in Saint Petersburg
1905 disasters in the Russian Empire